The following is a list of medical schools in Africa. It includes public and private universities and colleges with medical institutes, departments or faculties.

Algeria
University of Algiers (Université de Algiers – Benyoucef Benkhedda)
University of Annaba (Université Badji Mokhtar de Annaba)
University of Batna 2 (Université Mostefa Ben Boulaïd)
University of Blida (Université Saad Dahlab)
Université of Constantine (Université Fréres Mentouri)
University of Mostaganem (Université Abdelhamid Ibn Badis)
University of Oran (Université Es Sénia)
University of Ouargla (Université Kasdi Merbah Ouargla)
Université de Sétif (Université Ferhat Abbas de Setif)
University of Tizi Ouzou (Université Mouloud Mammeri de Tizi Ouzou)

Angola
Agostinho Neto University, Faculty of Medicine (Universidade Agostinho Neto, Faculdade de Medicina)
Jean Piaget University of Angola, Faculdade de ciências da saúde, curso de medicina (Universidade Jean Piaget de Angola)

Benin
 Université des Sciences de la Santé de Cotonou
 Université fr Médecine de Parakou
 Richmond International University Benin, Houdegbe North American universite
 Crown Point International School of Health Sciences And Technology( crownpointschools.com.ng

Botswana
University of Botswana, School of Medicine

Burkina Faso
Institut Supérieur des Sciences de la Santé
Unité de Formation et de Recherche en Sciences de la Santé
Université Saint Thomas d'Aquin

Burundi
Université Espoir d'Afrique
Université de Ngozi
Université du Burundi

Cameroon
Faculty of medicine and biomedical sciences Yaounde
Faculty of medicine and pharmaceutical sciences Douala
Faculty of Health sciences Buea
Université des Montagnes Bangante
Institut Superieur de Technologie Medicales Nkololoum, Yaounde
Faculty of Health Sciences Bamenda
Catholic University of Cameroon (CATUC) Kumbo

Congo-Brazzaville
Faculte des sciences de la santé (Brazzaville)

Congo-Kinshasa
 Université de Kinshasa Faculté de Médecine
 Université de Lubumbashi Faculté de Médecine
 Université de Kisangani Faculté de Médecine et Pharmacie
 Universite de Goma Faculte de Medecine
 Universite Officielle de Bukavu Faculte de Medecine et Pharmacie
 Universite Protestante du Congo Faculte de Medecine
 Université Shalom Bunia Faculté de Médecine
 Université Catholique du Graben Faculté de Médecine
 Universite Evangelique en Afrique Faculte de Medecine
 Université Notre Dame du Kasai Faculte de Medecine
 Universite de Kindu Faculte de Medecine
 Universite de Bandundu Faculte de Medecine
 Université Kongo Faculté de Médecine
 Université Simon Kimbangu Faculté de médecine
 Université libre des Pays des grands lacs (ULPGL) Faculté de médecine.

Côte d'Ivoire
Université de Cocody

Egypt
 Ain Shams University El-Demerdash Faculty of Medicine                   
 Al-Azhar University 
 Faculty of Medicine for Boys
 Faculty of Medicine for Girls
 Asyut Faculty of Medicine for Boys
 Damietta Faculty of Medicine
 Alexandria University Faculty of Medicine
 Arab Academy for Science, Technology and Maritime Transport College of Medicine
 Armed Forces College of Medicine
 Assiut University Faculty of Medicine
 Aswan University Faculty of Medicine
 Badr University in Cairo School of Medicine
 Benha University College of Human Medicine
 Beni Suef University Faculty of Medicine
 Cairo University Kasr Alainy School of Medicine
 Delta University for Science and Technology Faculty of Medicine
 Fayoum University Faculty of Medicine
 Galala University Faculty of Medicine
 Helwan University Faculty of Medicine
 Horus University Faculty of Medicine
 Kafrelsheikh University Faculty of Medicine
 King Salman International University Faculty of Medicine
 Mansoura University Faculty of Medicine
 Menoufia University Faculty of Medicine
 Merit University Faculty of Medicine
 Minia University Faculty of Medicine
 Misr University for Science and Technology College of Medicine
 Modern University for Technology and Information Faculty of Medicine
 Nahda University in Beni Suef Faculty of Medicine
 Newgiza University School of Medicine
 New Mansoura University Faculty of Medicine
 October 6 University Faculty of Medicine
 Port Said University Faculty of Medicine
 Sohag University Faculty of Medicine
 South Valley University Qena Faculty of Medicine
 Suez University Faculty of Medicine
 Suez Canal University Faculty of Medicine
 Tanta University Faculty of Medicine
 Zagazig University Faculty of Medicine

Eritrea
Orotta School of Medicine, Asmara, Eritrea

Ethiopia
Adama University, Asella School of Medicine
Adama Hospital Medical College( AHMC), Adama, Ethiopia
Addis Ababa University
Africa medical college
Bahirdar University College of Medicine and Health Science
Bethel Medical College
Debrebirhan University College of Health Science and Medicine
Gondar College of Medical Sciences
Haramaya University
Hawassa University
Hayat Medical College
Jimma University
Madda Walabu University Goba Referral Hospital
Mekelle University
MyungSung Medical College
St. Paul's Hospital Millennium Medical College
Wolaita Sodo University
Arbaminch university college of medicine and health science

Gabon
Faculté de Médecine et des Sciences de la Santé (FMSS)

Ghana
Accra College of Medicine, Accra
Kwame Nkrumah University of Science and Technology School of Medical Sciences, Kumasi
School of Medicine and Health Sciences, University for Development Studies, Tamale
University of Cape Coast School of Medical Sciences, Cape Coast
University of Ghana Medical School, Accra
University of Health and Allied Sciences School of Medicine, Ho
Family Health Medical School, Teshie

Kenya
There are twelve approved public and private medical school in Kenya according to the Kenya Medical Practitioners and Dentists Council:
University of Nairobi Medical School
Moi University Medical School
Kenyatta University Medical School 
Egerton University Medical School
Kenya Methodist University Medical School
Maseno University Medical School 
JKUAT Medical School 
Mount Kenya University Medical School
Uzima University School of Medicine
Maseno University School of Medicine 
Masinde Muliro University of Science and Technology School of Medicine
Kisii University School of Medicine

Liberia
 University of Liberia A. M. Dogliotti School of Medicine

Libya
 Libyan International Medical University
 Omar Al-Mukhtar University
 University of Benghazi
University of Tripoli

Malawi
 University of Malawi College of Medicine

Mauritius
 Anna Medical College and Research Centre
 Padmashree Dr D Y Patil Medical College
 Sir Seewoosagur Ramgoolam Medical College
 University of Mauritius

Mauritania
Faculte de medecine de Nouckchott

Morocco
Faculté de médecine et de Pharmacie de Casablanca
Faculté de médecine et de Pharmacie de Fes
Faculté de médecine et de Pharmacie de Marrakech
Faculté de médecine et de Pharmacie de Rabat
Faculté de médecine et de Pharmacie d'Oujda
Faculté de médecine et de Pharmacie de Tanger
 Université internationale Abulcasis des sciences de la santé
Université Mohammed 6 des Sciences de la Santé
Faculté de médecine privée de Marrakech

Mozambique
 Catholic University of Mozambique, Faculty of Medicine (Universidade Católica de Moçambique, Faculdade de Medicina)
 Eduardo Mondlane University, Faculty of Medicine (Universidade Eduardo Mondlane, Faculdade de Medicina)
 Lurio University, Health Science Faculty (Universidade Lurio, Faculdade de Ciências de Saúde)
 ISCTEM - Instituto Superior de Ciências e Tecnologia de Moçambique, School of Health Sciences

Namibia
 UNAM School of Medicine of the University of Namibia, Faculty of Health Sciences.

Nigeria
Abia State University, Uturu
 Abubakar Tafawa Balewa University, Bauchi
Afe Babalola 
 University College of Medicine, Ado Ekiti, Ekiti. 
African College of Health College of Medicine, FCT
Ahmadu Bello University, Zaria
Ambrose Alli University College of Medicine, Ekpoma
Babcock University, Ilishan Remo, Ogun State Nigeria
Bayero University, Kano
Benue State University, College of Health Sciences, Makurdi, Benue State.
Delta State University, Abraka 
Ebonyi State University, Abakaliki
Edo University Iyamho, College of Health Science, Iyamho, Edo State.
Ekiti State University, College of Medicine, Ado - Ekiti, Ekiti State.
Enugu State University Of Science And Technology, College of Medicine, Parklane, Enugu.
Igbinedion University, Okada, Edo State
Ladoke Akintola University of Technology (Lautech), Osogbo, Osun State
Lagos State University, Ikeja, Lagos
Madonna University, Elele, Rivers State
Nnamdi Azikiwe University, Nnewi
Obafemi Awolowo University, Ile-Ife
 Obafemi Awolowo College of Health Sciences, Olabisi Onabanjo University, Sagamu, Ogun State
University of Medical Sciences, Ondo City, Ondo State (UNIMED)
University of Benin
University of Calabar
University of Ibadan
University of medical Sciences, laje, Ondo
University of Ilorin
University of Jos
University of Lagos, Idi-Araba
University of Maiduguri
University of Nigeria, Enugu
University of Port Harcourt
(( Bingham University)) Karu
University of Uyo, Uyo
Usmanu Danfodiyo University
 Bingham University Karu
Bowen University, Iwo
Imo state University Owerri
Sani Zangon Daura College of Health Technology, Daura, Katsina State. (coheskat.edu.ng)
 Nile University of Nigeria, Abuja
PAMO University of Medical Sciences, Iriebe, Port Harcourt Nigeria

Rwanda
 University of Rwanda
 University of Gitwe
 Adventist University Of Central Africa

Senegal
Université El Hadji Ibrahima Niasse, St. Christopher Iba Mar Diop College of Medicine (formerly St. Christopher's College of Medicine from 2000 to 2005)

Seychelles
 The University of Seychelles American Institute of Medicine (USAIM) - The agreement between the Government of the Seychelles and the University was terminated at the end of January 2011. A grace period up to April 2013 was granted, which allowed enrolled students to complete their studies.

Somalia
Adal Medical University
Gollis University
Somali National University
Salaam University
Hargeisa University
Amoud University
Benadir University
East Africa University
Hope University
Mogadishu University
Somalia-Turkey Training and Research Hospital
Baresan University
East Africa University
University of Somalia
Somali International University
University of Health Science in Bosaso
Edna Adan University

South Africa

Tanzania

Catholic University of Health and Allied Sciences
Hubert Kairuki Memorial University
Kilimanjaro Christian Medical University College
 Muhimbili University of Health and Allied Sciences
 St. Francis University College of Health and Allied Sciences
 University of Dodoma
 University of Dar es Salaam 
SHMS, State University of Zanzibar (SUZA)
Kampala International University in Tanzania

Tunisia
University of Monastir, Faculty of Medicine of Monastir
University of Sfax, Faculty of Medicine of Sfax
University of Sousse, Faculty of medicine Ibn El Jazzar of Sousse
University of Tunis El Manar, Medicine School of Tunis
University of Monastir, Faculty of dental medicine of Monastir

Uganda

 Busitema University School of Medicine, Mbale
 Gulu University School of Medicine, Gulu
 Habib Medical School, Kibuli, Kampala
 International Health Sciences University, Namuwongo, Kampala
 Kampala International University School of Health Sciences, Bushenyi
 Makerere University School of Medicine, Mulago, Kampala
 Mbarara University School of Medicine, Mbarara
 Uganda Martyrs University School of Medicine, St. Francis Hospital Nsambya, Kampala
 Kabale University School of Medicine, Kabale
 Soroti University School of Health Sciences, Soroti
 King Ceasor University School of Medicine, Kampala

Zambia

 Lusaka Apex Medical University, Lusaka
 Cavendish University School of Medicine, Lusaka
 Copperbelt University School of Medicine, Ndola
 University of Zambia School of Medicine, Lusaka
 Mulungushi University School of Medicine, Livingstone
 livingstone International University for Tourism Excellence & Business Management Lusaka
Texila American University - Zambia
Levy Mwanawasa Medical University Lusaka

Zimbabwe

 University of Zimbabwe College of Health Sciences
Midlands State University Medical School
 National University of Science and Technology
Medical School

References

External links
World Directory of Medical Schools

Africa